"You Don't Know How It Feels" is a song and the lead single from American musician Tom Petty's 1994 album, Wildflowers. The track features candid lyrics describing the songwriter's desire for personal and professional autonomy. The single reached  1 on the US Billboard Album Rock Tracks chart, No. 3 on the Canadian RPM 100 Hit Tracks chart, and No. 13 on the Billboard Hot 100, becoming Petty's last top-40 hit in the US. An alternate version was posthumously released on June 26, 2020. This version peaked at No. 54 on the iTunes chart.

MTV, VH1, and many radio stations aired a censored version of "You Don't Know How It Feels," taking the word "roll" out of "let's roll another joint", as well as a version that played the word "joint" backwards. A version replacing the word "roll" with "hit" was also made. The music video won the MTV Video Music Award for Best Male Video in 1995. The girl in the video is Raven Snow; she also appeared in several episodes of Zalman King's Red Shoe Diaries and the film Delta of Venus as lounge singer Leila.

"Girl on LSD"
Petty originally intended the B-side of the single, "Girl on LSD", to appear on Wildflowers, but Warner Bros. refused because it was too controversial. In the song Petty sings about being in love with multiple girls on different drugs: marijuana, cocaine, LSD, beer, crystal meth, china white (a slang term for heroin) and coffee. In the chorus Petty states: "Through ecstasy, crystal meth and glue / I found no drug compares to you / All these pills, all this weed / I dunno just what I need."

Track listing
 "You Don't Know How It Feels"
 "House in the Woods"
 "Girl on LSD"
 "Mary Jane's Last Dance"
 "Something in the Air"

Charts

Weekly charts

Year-end charts

References

1994 singles
1994 songs
Grammy Award for Best Male Rock Vocal Performance
MTV Video Music Award for Best Male Video
Music videos directed by Phil Joanou
Song recordings produced by Rick Rubin
Songs about drugs
Songs written by Tom Petty
Tom Petty songs
Warner Records singles